Kostur, Bulgaria is a village in the municipality of Svilengrad, in Haskovo Province, in southern Bulgaria.

Kostur Point on Brabant Island in Palmer Archipelago, Antarctica is named after the village.

References

Villages in Haskovo Province